Hi-NRG is uptempo disco or electronic dance music usually featuring synthetic bassline octaves. This list contains some examples of hi-NRG artists and songs. Hi-NRG songs by non-hi NRG artists are also included.

Songs

1970s

Early 1980s

Mid- to late 1980s

1990s

2000s

2010s

Albums
1981: Patrick Cowley – Megatron Man
1982: Patrick Cowley – Mind Warp
1984: Kim Wilde – Teases & Dares
1985: Lime – Unexpected Lovers
1988: Dead or Alive – Nude
1991: Bananarama – Pop Life
1995: Traci Lords – 1000 Fires
2004: Bobby Orlando – I Love Bobby "O" (Volume 1)
2007: Róisín Murphy – Overpowered
2009: Bananarama – Viva
2013: Patrick Cowley – School Daze

Artists

Abigail
Bananarama
Claudja Barry
Biddu
Boys Town Gang
Bronski Beat
Miquel Brown
Cappella
The Communards
Al Corley
Corona
Patrick Cowley
Dead or Alive
Hazell Dean 
Divine
Jason Donovan
Erasure
Fancy
The Flirts
Frankie Goes to Hollywood
Nicki French
Fun Fun
Eartha Kitt
Ian Levine
Lime
Traci Lords
Man 2 Man
Kelly Marie
Giorgio Moroder
Alison Moyet
Bobby Orlando
Paul Parker
Man Parrish
People Like Us
Pet Shop Boys
Real McCoy
RuPaul
Sinitta
Jimmy Somerville
Stacey Q
Stock Aitken Waterman
Dua Lipa
Donna Summer
Selena
Suzy Q
Sylvester
Take That
Evelyn Thomas
Jeanie Tracy
Trans-X
Jessie Ware
Tina Charles
Sharon Redd
Miho Nakayama
Fiachra Trench
U.S.U.R.A.
Village People
The Weather Girls
Kim Wilde
Wink
Viola Wills
Tom Wilson

References

Bibliography

See also
List of Eurobeat artists

 
Hi-NRG